Fred Tilley is a Canadian politician, who was elected to the Nova Scotia House of Assembly in the 2021 Nova Scotia general election. He represents the riding of Northside-Westmount as a member of the Nova Scotia Liberal Party.

Prior to becoming an MLA, Mr. Tilley worked in the retail, construction, fishing, harvesting, and post-secondary education industries. Mr. Tilley served as Principal of NSCC's Marconi Campus from 2013-2021 and Academic Chair from 2001-2013. Mr. Tilley attended St. Francis Xavier University and Mount St. Vincent University. Mr. Tilley currently serves as Liberal caucus chair and finance critic.

Political career 
Following the resignation of Liberal Party of Nova Scotia leader Iain Rankin, Tilley publicly expressed his interest in launching a bid for the leader. However on February 18, 2021, Tilley announced his intent to support Angela Simmonds for leader of the Nova Scotia Liberal Party

Tilley is a member of the Community Services Committee.

Bills introduced

Electoral Record

References

Living people
Nova Scotia Liberal Party MLAs
21st-century Canadian politicians
People from the Cape Breton Regional Municipality
1968 births